The Muttur Polling Division is a Polling Division in the Trincomalee Electoral District, in the Eastern Province, Sri Lanka.

Presidential Election Results

Summary 

The winner of Muttur has matched the final country result 5 out of 8 times. Hence, Muttur is a Weak Bellwether for Presidential Elections.

2019 Sri Lankan Presidential Election

2015 Sri Lankan Presidential Election

2010 Sri Lankan Presidential Election

2005 Sri Lankan Presidential Election

1999 Sri Lankan Presidential Election

1994 Sri Lankan Presidential Election

1988 Sri Lankan Presidential Election

1982 Sri Lankan Presidential Election

Parliamentary Election Results

Summary 

The winner of Muttur has matched the final country result 3 out of 7 times.

2015 Sri Lankan Parliamentary Election

2010 Sri Lankan Parliamentary Election

2004 Sri Lankan Parliamentary Election

2001 Sri Lankan Parliamentary Election

2000 Sri Lankan Parliamentary Election

1994 Sri Lankan Parliamentary Election

1989 Sri Lankan Parliamentary Election

Demographics

Ethnicity 

The Muttur Polling Division has a Moor majority (61.9%) and a significant Sri Lankan Tamil population (37.0%) . In comparison, the Trincomalee Electoral District (which contains the Muttur Polling Division) has a Moor plurality (41.8%), a significant Sri Lankan Tamil population (30.7%) and a significant Sinhalese population (26.7%)

Religion 

The Muttur Polling Division has a Muslim majority (62.0%) and a significant Hindu population (33.0%) . In comparison, the Trincomalee Electoral District (which contains the Muttur Polling Division) has a Muslim plurality (42.0%), a significant Buddhist population (26.2%) and a significant Hindu population (25.9%)

References 

Polling Divisions of Sri Lanka
Polling Divisions of the Trincomalee Electoral District